St. George was a provincial riding in Ontario, Canada, that returned Members of Provincial Parliament (MPPs) to the Legislative Assembly of Ontario at Queen's Park. It was created in downtown Toronto in 1926 and was merged into the riding of St. George—St. David in 1987. The seat covered much of the city's central core, roughly similar to the current riding of Toronto Centre. At its dissolution it stretched from University Avenue to Parliament Street and from the waterfront north past St. Clair.

Boundaries
The riding was formed in 1926 from parts of the old Toronto Northeast and Toronto Southeast ridings. Its western boundary starting at Toronto Harbour went north following the line of Simcoe Street. At Queen Street West it jogged east a block to University Avenue. It followed this street north continuing along Queen's Park Crescent East and Avenue Road north to St. Clair Avenue West. At St. Clair it turned east and went to Yonge Street. At Yonge it turned south and followed this street to Bloor Street. It then turned east following Bloor until it reached Sherbourne Street. It then followed Sherbourne back south until it met the harbour.

Prior to the 1934 election, the riding boundaries were changed. The western boundary was moved east to Bay Street. The boundary followed Bay Street north from the harbour until it curved northwest to meet Davenport Road. It followed Davenport until it met Avenue Road. It turned north following Avenue Road north skirting Upper Canada College on the east side until it met the old Belt Line Railway right-of-way. It then headed southeast following the right-of-way until it reached Yonge Street. From here it turned south following a line through the Mount Pleasant cemetery and through a ravine called the Vale of Avoca (these days it is called David Balfour Park). It followed the ravine until it reached the CPR right-of-way. It headed east along this right-of-way until it reached MacLennan Avenue. It then turned south following this street and continued south on the same line when it turned into Sherbourne Street at Bloor. It continued along Sherbourne Street until it reached the harbour.

Members of Provincial Parliament

Election results

1926 boundaries

1934 boundaries

1945 boundaries

1967 boundaries

References

Notes

Citations

Former provincial electoral districts of Ontario
Provincial electoral districts of Toronto